St Leonard is a church in Cleator, Cumbria, England. It is an active Anglican parish church in the deanery of Calder, and the diocese of Carlisle. Its benefice is Crosslacon. The church is a grade 2 listed building.

History 

St Leonard's Church is first mentioned in the reign of King Henry I (1100 – 1135). The present chancel dates from that time but there is possibly even earlier evidence of a building phase (432) in the base of some walls. Below the ancient walls are the remains of earlier walls possibly pre Norman. It may be that these are the remains of the first church built in this Parish, erected by those who first evangelised these parts in Celtic days, possibly in the time of St Ninian (died 432), or St. Aidan (around 651). Richard of Cleator's brother, Nicholas, is recorded as ‘Nicholao persona’, and this has been interpreted as the first reference to the church at Cleator, ‘persona’ seemingly meaning ‘parson’. The rectory of the church at Cleator was held by Calder Abbey, founded 1134/5 as an offshoot of Furness Abbey. It is uncertain when the church at Cleator came into the possession of the monks of the abbey, as the chartulary for Calder Abbey no longer exists, but it was recorded at the Reformation as being in their possession. Restoration took place in the 15th century and again in 1792, 1841 and 1900.

Architecture 
The nave was rebuilt in 1841–42 by George Webster. The western baptistry, north porch, and vestry were added in 1903 (date in spandrels to porch door) by J.H. Martindale (Carlisle). The chancel has sandstone blocks on chamfered plinth with pilaster buttresses and blocking course; rest snecked rubble with stepped buttresses and castellated parapets. There are graduated slate roofs with apex crosses to stone copings and gabled bellcote to west end, over porch. There are corniced octagonal stone chimneys to vestry on north side. There is a nave with western baptistry and north porch and lower chancel. The windows to chancel's side walls are original with triple lancets to the east end are possibly 19th Century. All other windows are early 20th Century copies of 16th Century windows (traceried to west end and south side). There are 2 segment-headed arches open onto north porch; vestry door to east, porch door (with inscription above) to west, and stone bench along nave wall. The interior, a 4-bay nave with hammer-beam roof. The chancel has foliate bosses to a wooden barrel vault. The 4-centred arches to baptistry and chancel have Gothic panelling to reveals. There is a Medieval piscina in the chancel with Gothic wainscoting possibly 19th Century. There is a mural stair on south side of nave to polygonal carved stone pulpit. The font is possibly 17th Century with hexagonal bowl on column carried on an octagonal plinth. The stained glass windows are by Heaton, Butler & Bayne (London) and Abbott & Co. (London and Lancaster). The nave and choir seating are from 1906.

Churchyard 
The churchyard has approximately 200 grave stones including 2 Commonwealth War Graves from the First World War

References

External links 
 https://crosslacon.net/our-churches/st-leonards-cleator/

Church of England church buildings in Cumbria
Diocese of Carlisle
Cleator Moor